Heather Blitz (born December 25, 1968) is an American dressage rider. Blitz won team gold and individual silver in the 2011 Pan American Games, and was a part of the U.S. Olympic team for the 2012 London Olympic Games. Blitz teaches Annie Peavy, who has been named to the U.S. Paralympic Team and will compete in the 2016 Paralympic Games.

Career
Blitz began competing in dressage in 1994. 
She rode in Grand Prix competitions in Florida on the Danish horse Rambo, then moved to Denmark for several years. While living in Denmark, she competed across Europe on another Danish Warmblood, Otto.
She won team gold and individual silver in 2011 at the Pan American Games.
Blitz has periodically taken lessons from six-time Olympic rider Robert Dover.

Blitz's competition horse since prior to the Pan American Games is a Danish Warmblood gelding named Paragon, who stands  and is estimated to weigh 1,600 pounds. Blitz herself bred Paragon, attended his foaling, and began training him herself when he was three years old. She initially got the idea to breed him after riding his dam on a farm in Louisiana and being impressed with her gaits and temperament. Blitz originally intended to sell Paragon when he reached maturity, but later decided to keep him and compete him herself. Paragon has never been trained or ridden in competition by anyone but Blitz. In 2012, Blitz was part of the United States Equestrian Team, and competed in the London Olympics.

Blitz trains paralympic dressage rider Annie Peavy, who is scheduled to compete in the 2016 Summer Paralympics with her Hanoverian, Reno's Lancelot Warrior.

Blitz lives in Wellington, Florida.

References

American dressage riders
1968 births
Equestrians at the 2011 Pan American Games
Living people
American female equestrians
Pan American Games medalists in equestrian
Pan American Games gold medalists for the United States
Pan American Games silver medalists for the United States
Medalists at the 2011 Pan American Games
21st-century American women